Nicholas Pike is an English film and television music composer.

He was born in Water Orton, Warwickshire, England, and is known for featuring unique sounds and instrumentation. He started his music career at the age of 7 at the prestigious Canterbury Choir School and subsequently moved to Cape Town, South Africa at the age of 10 where he continued in music becoming Head Chorister at St George's Grammar School, Cathedral choir as well as playing the flute with the Cape Town Symphony Orchestra at the age of 15. He was also a member of the iconic rock band Hammak and toured the country with this and other bands. At age 17 he left to study flute and composition in Boston at the Berklee School of Music after which he moved to New York City, where he recorded and performed with his band FluteJuice featuring Bill Frisell, Billy Hart, Kenny Werner, Hank Roberts among many others. He also recorded and released the album Waterlilies with Brazilian percussionist Nana Vasconcelos and guitar virtuoso Bill Connors. Before embarking on his film scoring career he conducted and recorded his suite "Master Harold and the Boys" with the London Symphony Orchestra which was based on Athol Fugard's apartheid era play of the same name.

As a film composer he has written for projects ranging from Stephen King's The Shining to Disney's Captain Ron as well as animated films such as Disney's The Prince and the Pauper. Awards include the Elmer Bernstein Award for his score to Love Object at the Woodstock Film Festival, the Best Music Award from the Sitges Cinema Fantastic Festival for his score to Critters 2 and the Emmy for original music for the HBO documentary In Tahrir Square about the beginnings of the Arab Spring.

He has also written music for large-scale music videos including Michael Jackson's "Ghost" and "You Rock My World", MC Hammer's "Too Legit To Quit" and "Here Comes The Hammer" and Will Smith's "Wild Wild West". He was recently hand-picked by actress/comedian and talk show host Bonnie Hunt to create and lead the first-ever daytime talk show live band for The Bonnie Hunt Show which aired on the NBC network. Pike also composed the music for the show. He recently wrote and produced the song "On Ghost Ridge" for the documentary 100 Years: One Woman's Fight for Justice chronicling the epic battle between Blackfeet Indian Elouise Cobell and the US government. The song was performed by Malaysian pop star Yuna and was currently under consideration for an Academy Award Nomination.

Most recently he arranged and produced the songs and composed the score for a Steven Spielberg story, part of the new Amazing Stories for Apple as well as composing and producing an operatic piece performed by Ana María Martínez for the upcoming documentary Viva Verdi. Pike composed the first episode of Apple TV+'s series Amazing Stories).

Filmography

Blood and Bone
Fair Haired Child (Masters of Horror)
Michael Jackson's Ghosts
The Lot
The Shining
Tales from the Crypt
Telling Lies in America
Bag of Bones

References

External links

Official Bio

Year of birth missing (living people)
Living people
English composers
People from Warwickshire
Varèse Sarabande Records artists